Al-Sultan Mohammed I Sri Sundhura Abaarana Mahaaradhun was the Sultan of the Maldives from 1380 to 1385. He was the son of Kaeumani Kaulhanna Kilege and husband of his predecessor Raadhafathi. He ruled the country for 5 years until his death in 1385. He was succeeded by his daughter Dhaain. He is also known as Maakurathu Mohamed Rasgefaan or Mohamed of Maakurathu as he is from the island of Maakurathu in Raa Atoll ( Maalhosmadulhu Atoll ) of Maldives.

References

1385 deaths
14th-century sultans of the Maldives
Year of birth unknown